Stangvik is a former municipality in Møre og Romsdal county, Norway. The  municipality existed from 1838 until its dissolution in 1965.  The municipality of Stangvik (historically spelled Stangvig) encompassed much of the area surrounding the Trongfjorden and the smaller fjords that branch off of it such as the Ålvundfjorden, Stangvikfjorden, and Todalsfjorden. The municipality was mostly located in what is now Surnadal Municipality and also small portions of what is now Sunndal Municipality and Tingvoll Municipality. The administrative centre of the municipality was the village of Stangvik where Stangvik Church is located.

History
The municipality of Stangvig was established on 1 January 1838 (see formannskapsdistrikt law). According to the 1865 census, the municipality had a population of 2,619.  On 1 January 1874, a part of Stangvik (population: 61) was moved to neighboring Tingvoll Municipality.  Then on 1 January 1877, another part of Stangvik (population: 50) was moved to Surnadal Municipality.  In 1879, parts of Surnadal (population: 83) and Halsa Municipality (population: 279) were moved to Stangvik.  On 1 January 1886, the Møklegjerdet farm (population: 29), just west of Glærem, was transferred from Stangvik to Surnadal.  On 1 January 1897, the Sjøflot farm (population: 27), also just west of Glærem, was transferred from Stangvik to Surnadal. On 1 May 1895, the area around the Åsskardfjorden and the Hamnesfjorden in the northern part of Stangvik was split off from Stangvik to constitute the new municipality of Aasgaard, leaving Stangvik with 2,354 inhabitants.

During the 1960s, there were many municipal mergers across Norway due to the work of the Schei Committee. On 1 January 1965, the municipality of Stangvik ceased to exist.  The district around the village of Ålvund and the Ålvundfjorden (population: 508) was moved to the neighboring Sunndal Municipality, the district around the villages of Åsprong and Sandnes (population: 26) was moved to the neighboring Tingvoll Municipality, and the rest of Stangvik (population: 1,386), along with Åsskard Municipality, was merged into Surnadal Municipality.

Government
All municipalities in Norway, including Stangvik, are responsible for primary education (through 10th grade), outpatient health services, senior citizen services, unemployment and other social services, zoning, economic development, and municipal roads.  The municipality is governed by a municipal council of elected representatives, which in turn elects a mayor.

Municipal council
The municipal council  of Stangvik was made up of 21 representatives that were elected to four year terms.  The party breakdown of the final municipal council was as follows:

See also
List of former municipalities of Norway

References

Surnadal
Sunndal
Former municipalities of Norway
1838 establishments in Norway
1965 disestablishments in Norway